Hermes Neves Soares, nicknamed Hermes (born 19 September 1974) is a Brazilian football manager and former player who played as a midfielder. He is currently in charge of I liga club Arka Gdynia.

Career

Hermes previously played for Bahia in the Campeonato Brasileiro.

National team

He was a member of Brazil national under-20 football team, which won the World Youth Cup in 1993.

Honours
As player
Corinthians
Copa do Brasil: 1995

Jagiellonia Białystok
Polish Cup: 2009–10
Polish Super Cup: 2010

Zawisza Bydgoszcz
I liga: 2012–13
Polish Cup: 2013–14

Brazil U20
FIFA U-20 World Cup: 1993

References

External links
 
 Hermes  at jagiellonia.neostrada.pl 

1974 births
Living people
Brazilian footballers
Esporte Clube Bahia players
Esporte Clube São Bento players
Rio Branco Esporte Clube players
Sport Club Corinthians Paulista players
Brusque Futebol Clube players
Ituano FC players
Widzew Łódź players
Korona Kielce players
Expatriate footballers in Poland
Jagiellonia Białystok players
Polonia Bytom players
Zawisza Bydgoszcz players
Ekstraklasa players
I liga players
Brazilian emigrants to Poland
Brazilian expatriate sportspeople in Poland
Naturalized citizens of Poland
Brazilian expatriate footballers
Brazil under-20 international footballers
Association football midfielders
Footballers from São Paulo
Brazilian football managers
Arka Gdynia managers
I liga managers
Brazilian expatriate football managers
Expatriate football managers in Poland